In Greek mythology, Agrius (Ancient Greek: Ἄγριος Agrios means 'wild, savage') was a Calydonian prince as the son of King Porthaon and Euryte; he was the brother of Oeneus (successor of their father as king of Calydon), Alcathous, Melas, Leucopeus, and Sterope.

Family 
Agrius was the father of six sons, namely Melanippus, Thersites, Onchestus, Prothous, Celeutor, Lycopeus, possibly all by Dia, daughter of Porthaon (which makes the wife technically his sister or half-sister). Alcathous may also be the son of Agrius, when Diodorus claimed that together with Lycopeus, he was killed by their cousin Tydeus who fled to Argos.

Mythology 
His sons overthrew Oeneus and gave the kingdom to their father. Agrius and his sons were themselves overthrown by Diomedes, who reinstated Oeneus as king. All the sons except Thersites were killed by Diomedes. The Bibliotheca places these events before the expedition of the Greeks against Troy, while Hyginus states that Diomedes, when he heard, after the fall of Troy, of the misfortune of his grandfather Oeneus, hastened back and expelled Agrius, who then committed suicide; according to others, Agrius and his sons were all slain by Diomedes.

Notes

References 

 Antoninus Liberalis, The Metamorphoses of Antoninus Liberalis translated by Francis Celoria (Routledge 1992). Online version at the Topos Text Project.
Apollodorus, The Library with an English Translation by Sir James George Frazer, F.B.A., F.R.S. in 2 Volumes, Cambridge, MA, Harvard University Press; London, William Heinemann Ltd. 1921. ISBN 0-674-99135-4. Online version at the Perseus Digital Library. Greek text available from the same website.
Diodorus Siculus, The Library of History translated by Charles Henry Oldfather. Twelve volumes. Loeb Classical Library. Cambridge, Massachusetts: Harvard University Press; London: William Heinemann, Ltd. 1989. Vol. 3. Books 4.59–8. Online version at Bill Thayer's Web Site
Diodorus Siculus, Bibliotheca Historica. Vol 1–2. Immanel Bekker. Ludwig Dindorf. Friedrich Vogel. in aedibus B. G. Teubneri. Leipzig. 1888–1890. Greek text available at the Perseus Digital Library.
Gaius Julius Hyginus, Fabulae from The Myths of Hyginus translated and edited by Mary Grant. University of Kansas Publications in Humanistic Studies. Online version at the Topos Text Project.
Graves, Robert, The Greek Myths, Harmondsworth, London, England, Penguin Books, 1960. 
Graves, Robert, The Greek Myths: The Complete and Definitive Edition. Penguin Books Limited. 2017. 

 Pausanias, Description of Greece with an English Translation by W.H.S. Jones, Litt.D., and H.A. Ormerod, M.A., in 4 Volumes. Cambridge, MA, Harvard University Press; London, William Heinemann Ltd. 1918. Online version at the Perseus Digital Library
 Pausanias, Graeciae Descriptio. 3 vols. Leipzig, Teubner. 1903.  Greek text available at the Perseus Digital Library.
Publius Ovidius Naso, The Epistles of Ovid. London. J. Nunn, Great-Queen-Street; R. Priestly, 143, High-Holborn; R. Lea, Greek-Street, Soho; and J. Rodwell, New-Bond-Street. 1813. Online version at the Perseus Digital Library.

Princes in Greek mythology
Kings in Greek mythology
Aetolian characters in Greek mythology
Suicides in Greek mythology